AECC may refer to:
 Aberdeen Exhibition and Conference Centre
 Aero Engine Corporation of China
 Alderley Edge Cricket Club
 Anglo-European College of Chiropractic
 American Evangelical Christian Churches
 Arkansas Electric Cooperative Corporation
 Athens English Comedy Club
 AECC University College